The Modern Art Week was an arts festival in São Paulo, Brazil, that ran from February 10 to February 17, 1922.  Historically, the Week marked the start of Brazilian Modernism; though a number of individual Brazilian artists were doing modernist work before the week, it coalesced and defined the movement and introduced it to Brazilian society at large. For Brazil, it was as important as the International Exhibition of Modern Art (also known as the Armory Show), held in New York City in 1913, which became a legendary watershed date in the history of American art.

The Week took place at the Municipal Theater in São Paulo, and included plastic arts exhibitions, lectures, concerts, and reading of poems.  In its breadth it differed significantly from the Armory Show, with which it is often compared, but which featured only visual art.  It was organized chiefly by painter Emiliano Di Cavalcanti and poet Mário de Andrade, in an attempt to bring to a head a long-running conflict between the young modernists and the cultural establishment, headed by the Brazilian Academy of Letters, which adhered strictly to academicism. The event was controversial at best and divisive at worst, with one member of the Academy, Graça Aranha, ostracized for attending. He had opened the week with a conference titled "The aesthetic emotion in modern art". Due to the radicalism (for the times) of some of their poems and music, the artists were vigorously booed and pelted by the audience, and the press and art critics in general were strong in their condemnation (such as in a famous episode by editor, writer and art critic Monteiro Lobato).

The group that took part in the Week, contrary to their initial intentions, did not remain a unified movement.  A number of separate groups split off, and the original core members had separated by 1929.  Two divisions predominated: the Anthropophagics (cannibalists), led by Oswald de Andrade, wanted to make use of the influence of European and American artists but freely create their own art out of the regurgitations of what they had taken from abroad (thus the term anthropophagy: they would "eat" all influences, digest it, and throw out new things).  The Nationalists wanted no foreign influences, and sought a "purely Brazilian" form of art. This group was led by writer Plínio Salgado, who later became a fascist political leader (Brazilian Integralism) and was arrested by dictator Getúlio Vargas after a failed coup.

Before the events leading up to 1922, São Paulo was a prosperous but relatively culturally unimportant city.  However, the Week established São Paulo as the seat of the new modernist movement, against the far more culturally conservative Rio de Janeiro.

Participants

Painters
Anita Malfatti
Emiliano Di Cavalcanti
Zina Aita
Vicente do Rego Monteiro
Ferrignac (Ignácio da Costa Ferreira)
Yan de Almeida Prado
John Graz
Alberto Martins Ribeiro
Oswaldo Goeldi

Architects
Georg Przyrembel

Writers
Mário de Andrade
Oswald de Andrade
Menotti del Picchia
Sérgio Milliet
Plínio Salgado
Ronald de Carvalho
Agenor Fernandes Barbosa
Álvaro Moreira
Renato de Almeida
Ribeiro Couto
Guilherme de Almeida
Graça Aranha

Composers
Heitor Villa-Lobos
Guiomar Novais
Ernani Braga
Frutuoso Viana

See also 

 Brazilian art

References

External links
Brazil Body and Soul, exhibit at the Guggenheim Museum
Semana de Arte Moderna 

Modern art
Brazilian art
1922 in Brazil
Art festivals in Brazil
Arts festivals in Brazil
Culture in São Paulo
Festivals in São Paulo
First Brazilian Republic